Trioceros pfefferi, Pfeffer's chameleon or the Bakossi two-horned chameleon, is a species of chameleon endemic to Cameroon.

References

Trioceros
Reptiles described in 1900
Taxa named by Gustav Tornier
Reptiles of Cameroon
Fauna of the Cameroonian Highlands forests